Tsing Leng Tsui is a former cape on Tsing Yi Island, Hong Kong between the former Tsing Yi Bay and the Rambler Channel. After several phases of reclamation, the cape lost its shape and became the location of the Hong Kong Cement Plant belonging to Hong Kong Cement Manufacturing Company Limited. The area changed to a promenade and the Grand Horizon residential estate after the plant was relocated to Ngau Kok Wan, northwest of the island, owing to environmental concerns voiced by residents of neighbouring Greenfield Garden.

Tsing Yi
Capes of Hong Kong